Viśa' Saṃbhava (Khotanese language, in ; Chinese name: Li Shengtian, ; died 962, 966 or 967) was the king of Khotan from 912 to 962, 966 or 967. He adopted  as his era name.

In another act of marital diplomacy, Cao Yijin's grandson, married Saṃbhava's third daughter.

References
Old History of the Five Dynasties

Year of birth unknown
962 deaths
966 deaths
967 deaths
Asian kings
10th-century Chinese monarchs
10th-century monarchs in Asia
Saka people
Central Asian people
History of Xinjiang